van Turnhout is a surname. Notable people with the surname include:

Geert van Turnhout ( 1520–1580), Flemish composer
Jan van Turnhout ( 1545–1614 or 1618), Flemish composer
Jillian van Turnhout (born 1968), Irish politician

Surnames of Dutch origin